Daniel Blumenthal may refer to:
 Daniel Blumenthal (politician) (1860–1930), French politician
 Daniel Blumenthal (pianist) (born 1952), German-American pianist and laureate of the 1983 Queen Elisabeth Music Competition